Laevipilina hyalina is a species of monoplacophoran, a superficially limpet-like marine mollusk. It is found off the coast of southern California.

Anatomy
L. hyalina is the only Laevipilina species with 6 pairs of gills, while all other Laevipilina species have 5 pairs.

References

Monoplacophora
Molluscs described in 1979